Chris Spearman is a Canadian politician, who was elected mayor of Lethbridge, Alberta in the 2013 municipal election on October 21, 2013. He was re-elected in the 2017 municipal election on October 16, 2017 with 74% of the popular vote.

A longtime trustee on the city's Roman Catholic school board and a member of the Chamber of Commerce, Spearman finished second to Dodic in the 2010 municipal election. He announced in January 2021 that he would not seek re-election.

References

External links
Mayor's Biography

Mayors of Lethbridge
Living people
Saint Mary's University (Halifax) alumni
Academic staff of the University of Lethbridge
Date of birth missing (living people)
Year of birth missing (living people)
21st-century Canadian politicians